Lisbon School Department is a school district in Lisbon Falls, Androscoggin County, Maine, United States.  It provides primary and secondary education to an administrative district of Maine known as Union 30.

Schools
Lisbon Community School
Philip W Sugg Middle School
Lisbon High School

See also
List of school districts in Maine

External links

School districts in Maine
Education in Androscoggin County, Maine